Oskar Opsahl (born 25 August 2001) is a Norwegian football defender currently playing for Tromsø.

He is a younger brother of Sakarias Opsahl.

References

2001 births
Living people
Footballers from Oslo
Norwegian footballers
Vålerenga Fotball players
Eliteserien players
Association football defenders
Norway youth international footballers
Norway under-21 international footballers